Para Wirra may refer to any of the following places in South Australia:

Hundred of Para Wirra
District Council of Para Wirra
Para Wirra Conservation Park